Vist may refer to:

Vist, Iran
Vist Station
Serbian whist